Gymnastics events were competed at the 2002 South American Games in Curitiba, Brazil, at the Ginásio de Esportes Professor Almir Nelson de Almeida, also known as Ginásio do Tarumã.

Medal summary

Medal table

Artistic gymnastics

Men

Women

Rhythmic gymnastics

References 

2002 South American Games events
South American Games
2002 South American Games
International gymnastics competitions hosted by Brazil